Eagle Valley is a basin in the Temescal Mountains, of Riverside County, California. The basin is overlooked by summits of the Temescal Mountains on the west, north and east, the tallest is 1,857-foot Arlington Mountain on the northeast. The valley is drained by three streams, the primary one, has its source on the south slope of Arlington Mountain and drains southwestward into Cajalco Canyon and Cajalco Canyon Creek.

The basin and mountains were encompassed by part of the Mexican land grant of Rancho San Jacinto Sobrante.

References 

Eagle Valley (California)
Valleys of Riverside County, California